The 2000 Vaahteraliiga season was the 21st season of the highest level of American football in Finland. The regular season took place between May 20 and July 9, 2000 and the qualification round took place between July 22 and August 27, 2000. The two best teams of the round met at the championship game Vaahteramalja XXI, in which the Helsinki Roosters won the Seinäjoki Crocodiles.

Regular season

Qualification round

Playoffs

References 

American football in Finland
Vaahteraliiga
Vaahteraliiga